Trójczyce  is a village in the administrative district of Gmina Orły, within Przemyśl County, Subcarpathian Voivodeship, in south-eastern Poland.

References

Villages in Przemyśl County